Otto Bühler (date of birth and death unknowns) was a Swiss footballer who was a squad member for Switzerland in the 1934 FIFA World Cup. He also played for Grasshopper Club Zürich.

References

Swiss men's footballers
Switzerland international footballers
1934 FIFA World Cup players
Association football forwards
Grasshopper Club Zürich players
Year of birth missing